Dig a Pony (DAP) was a bar and restaurant in Portland, Oregon. Named after the Beatles' song of the same name, the business opened in mid 2011. Dig a Pony closed in June 2022, following an ownership change.

Description
Dig a Pony had a 40-person horseshoe-shaped bar, as well as a century-old piano, vintage church pews, and stained glass. The menu included American cuisine such as sautéed mushrooms with soft egg and French fries, chicken thighs with stewed tomatoes and almonds, and a barbecue tempeh sandwich served with avocado and citrus coleslaw. The bar began using cheese from Bandon-based Face Rock Creamery in 2015.

When Burger Stevens moved into the kitchen, the menu included hamburgers, fried chicken sandwiches, a Cuban-inspired sandwich with barbecue pork, ham and pickles, and griddled broccoli with green ranch and pickled peppers.

History
The bar replaced longtime Greek diner Niki's Restaurant. Partners Jacob Carey, Aaron Hall, and Page Finlay opened Dig a Pony with Gregory Gourdet as consulting chef. The bar opened on July 28, 2011, with Josef Valoff as kitchen manager. Within a few months, several interior decorations were stolen, including a taxidermy pheasant nicknamed "David Bowie". The bar hosted an anniversary celebration featuring free music.

In 2015, the bar and Face Rock Creamery's president Greg Drobot hosted Mongers' Lodge Night featuring cheese samples, cocktails, music, and happy hour specials. Don Salamone, owner of the food cart Burger Stevens, moved into the kitchen in 2018. A walk-up window for Burger Stevens opened on the Morrison Street side of Dig a Pony in 2019. During the COVID-19 pandemic, Salamone served takeout Italian meals as Stevens Italiano; the meals included chicken cacciatore, rigatoni in tomato sauce, Caesar salad, and garlic bread.

In 2022, the business was sold to Elizabeth Elder and Bryan Wollen of Lose Yr Mind Fest, as well as Devon and Tyler Treadwell of the Tulip Shop Tavern in north Portland. Dig a Pony closed in June 2022.

Reception
In 2017, Tan Vinh of The Seattle Times said the bar "spins soul and has the soul of old Portland".

See also 

 List of defunct restaurants of the United States

References

External links

 
 Dig a Pony at Portland Monthly
 Dig a Pony at Thrillist
 Dig a Pony at Zagat
 Burger Stevens at Dig a Pony at Zomato

2011 establishments in Oregon
2022 disestablishments in Oregon
Buckman, Portland, Oregon
Defunct drinking establishments in Oregon
Defunct restaurants in Portland, Oregon
Restaurants disestablished in 2022
Restaurants established in 2011